This is the only Prime Ministerial Election in Singapore history. The People's Action Party Central Executive Committee met on the victory of the 1959 Singaporean general election to elect a Prime Minister. At the end of the election, Lee Kuan Yew won by a mere 1 vote, that was voted by the then party Chairman Toh Chin Chye.

Candidates

Lee Kuan Yew 
On 12 November 1954, Lee, together with a group of fellow English-educated middle-class men whom he himself described as "beer-swilling bourgeois", formed the 'socialist' People's Action Party (PAP) in an expedient alliance with the pro-communist trade unionists. This alliance was described by Lee as a marriage of convenience, since the English-speaking group needed the Chinese-speaking pro-communists' mass support base while the communists needed a non-communist party leadership as a 'smoke-screen' because the Malayan Communist Party was illegal. At that time, almost 70% of Singapore spoke Chinese and various Chinese dialects as their native tongues, and those who speak English as their native tongue only comprised 20% or so of the population. They were therefore, a minority.

Their common aim was to agitate for self-government and put an end to British colonial rule.

An inaugural conference was held at the Victoria Memorial Hall, attended by over 1,500 supporters and trade unionists. Lee became secretary-general, a post he held until 1992, save for a brief period in 1957.

Ong Eng Guan

A staunch anti-communist and PAP treasurer, he was a Chinese-educated orator who was one of the pioneer members of the People's Action Party (PAP) Ong was well known among the Chinese community in Singapore, In the 1957 City Hall Elections, he was elected mayor after the PAP won 13 out of 32 seats contested, and due to the other opposition parties dividing themselves over the remaining 19 seats, the PAP gained the majority.

Ong's anti-colonial stance shocked the British government and every City Council meetings then were considered entertainment for the spectators there. Ong continued to be in helm over the city council for two years until when the PAP gained control over Singapore in 1959, when the council was scrapped.

Results
 
! Candidate
! Party
! Votes
! colspan="2"| Percentage (%)
|-
| Lee Kuan Yew
| style="right" |
| align="right" |6+C
| align="right" |50.00
| align="right" | 
|-
| Ong Eng Guan
| style="right" |
| align="right" |6
| align="right" |50.00
| align="right" | 
|-
| colspan="2" align="right" | Valid votes
| align="right" |12
| colspan="2" align="right"|100.00
|-
| colspan="2" align="right" | Rejected votes
| align="right" |0
| colspan="2" align="right"|0.00
|-
| colspan="2" align="right" | Total vote cast
| align="right" |12
| colspan="2" align="right"|100.00
|-
|}

References

Prime Ministerial election 1959
PAP Prime Ministerial election 1959